Leland Richard Jacobson (February 9, 1890 - June 5, 1928) served in the California State Assembly for the 27th district from 1925 to 1928. During World War I he also served in the United States Army.

Jacobson died on June 5, 1928, while being operated on in the hospital for Appendicitis.

References

United States Army personnel of World War I
Republican Party members of the California State Assembly
1890 births
1928 deaths